The Khmer Times is an English-language newspaper, launched in May 2014, based in Phnom Penh, Cambodia, and owned by Malaysian national Mohan Tirugmanasam Bandam.

The newspaper is strongly pro-CPP in its reporting and editorials.

Plagiarism 
An extensive history of plagiarism has been documented, with the paper's Malaysian owner Mohan Tirugmanasam Bandam (writing as T. Mohan) taking content from Malaysian newspapers and making small changes such as swapping names and places from Malaysian to Cambodian contexts. The "Letters to the editor" section of the Khmer Times has published a large number of plagiarized letters, as well letters that appear to have been authored by T. Mohan using false Khmer and western names.

References

Newspapers published in Cambodia